Sergei Pyzhianov (born October 24, 1960) is a former Soviet pistol shooter. During the last few years of the Soviet Union's dominance, he was a major star on the pistol team. He was born in Kem.

Although never an Olympic champion, he competed at three Olympics, 1980,  1992 and  1996, winning a silver medal in the 10m air pistol in 1992.

He also won the ISSF World Shooting Championships three times: in 1986 (50 metre pistol), 1989 (10 metre air pistol) and 1990 (25 metre center-fire pistol). In 1989, he also won the first ISSF World Cup Final with the new air pistol targets, setting two new world records after 593 points in the qualification round and 102.1 points in the final round. The former stood until 2009 and the latter remains unbeaten.

References

Soviet male sport shooters
Russian male sport shooters
ISSF pistol shooters
World record holders in shooting
Shooters at the 1980 Summer Olympics
Shooters at the 1992 Summer Olympics
Shooters at the 1996 Summer Olympics
Olympic shooters of the Soviet Union
Olympic shooters of the Unified Team
Olympic shooters of Russia
Olympic silver medalists for the Unified Team
Living people
Olympic medalists in shooting
1960 births
People from Kem
Medalists at the 1992 Summer Olympics
Sportspeople from the Republic of Karelia